Kingston City Football Club is an Australian, professional soccer club from Clayton South, Victoria (within the local government area of Kingston), whose home ground is The Grange Reserve. Kingston club is competing in 2020 in the National Premier Leagues Victoria 2.

History
The club was established in 1974 in the south-eastern Melbourne suburb of Clarinda by members of the local Greek Australian community. Originally called Liverpool Soccer Club, the club was renamed Clarinda Soccer Club the following year (1975). Playing many of its home games on the grounds of Clayton Technical School in Clayton, Victoria, the club spent most of its early years competing in the lower divisions of the Victorian District Leagues. In 1982 the club moved to its current home ground The Grange in the neighbouring suburb of Clayton South, Victoria, and in 1998 was renamed Kingston City Soccer Club. The name change was made to reflect the amalgamation of local city councils and the restructuring of city borders, but also to broaden the club's appeal amongst the non-Greek population in the local area.

Kingston City competed in the 2006 Victorian Premier League after back-to-back promotions in 2004 and 2005, winning the State League Division One title in the latter year. The club's stay in the top-flight was short-lived, though, suffering relegation in 2007. Financial struggles then blighted the club, with debt as high as six-figures hindering Kingston's operations. A second relegation followed in 2008 when City finished bottom of State League 1 and then a third consecutive relegation when it finished bottom of the 2009 State League Division Two South-East.

After finishing his playing career at the end of the 2012 State League Division 2 South-East season, Nick Tolios took over as head coach of the club.

In 2014, Kingston City was announced as one of the successful applicants for the newly introduced National Premier Leagues Victoria, joining the second division, the new second tier of football in Victoria. Kingston finished in 8th place in its first season in the 14-team league.

The following season, six additional clubs were added to National Premier Leagues Victoria 2, with the division splitting into East and West conferences of ten sides each. Kingston finished in 6th place in NPL2 East in 2015.

On 3 September 2016, Kingston City achieved promotion from to NPL Victoria in dramatic circumstances. Needing to avoid defeat on the final match-day of the regular season, Damian Iaconis scored a 94th-minute equaliser to achieve automatic promotion into the top flight. In the 2016 NPL2 Grand Final, Kingston City came back from 2–0 down to win 3–2 against St Albans Saints, with Slaven Vranesevic scoring two near-identical free kicks, and Kingston were crowned NPL Victoria 2 Champions. Velibor Mitrovic was top goalscorer with 19 goals.

Kingston finished in 10th place in its first season in the NPL in 2017, seven points clear of the relegation playoff spot. Iaconis top-scored with 12 goals. The following season, City finished just outside of the finals series, two points behind Port Melbourne in sixth place. Iaconis once again top-scored with 11 goals. In 2019, after three seasons in the top flight in Victoria, Kingston City were relegated, finishing in second-bottom place, one point short of Dandenong Thunder in the relegation play-off spot. After relegation was confirmed, Tolios left the club to take up an opportunity at Bentleigh Greens after seven years as head coach of Kingston.

Kingston then appointed Con Tangalakis as manager for the 2020 season.

Honours

NPL2 Champions: 2016
NPL2 Premiers: 2016
Victorian State League Division 1 Champions: 2005
Victorian State League Division 2 Champions: 1994, 2002
Victorian State League Division 3 Champions: 2011 Seniors & Reserves
Victorian State League Division 4 Champions: 1986
Victorian State League Provisional League 1 Champions: 1985
Hellenic Cup Winners: 1983, 1993–94

2019 Senior Men's National Premier Leagues Victoria Squad
as of February 2019

Competition Timeline

R relegated P promoted C champions F finals

References

External links
Kingston City FC Official website

Association football clubs established in 1974
Soccer clubs in Melbourne
Greek-Australian culture in Victoria
1974 establishments in Australia
Sport in the City of Kingston (Victoria)